Monkey Magic may refer to:

 Monkey Magic: The Movie, a film version of the 2006 Saiyūki TV series released in 2007 in Japan and in 2008 in the US
 Monkey Magic (Japanese TV series) (1998–1999), an animated series
 Monkey Magic (1999 video game), a PlayStation game based on the animated series
 Monkey (TV series) or Saiyūki (1978–1980), a live-action Japanese television series
 "Monkey Magic" (song), the show's theme song
 Monkey Magic (C64 game), a 1984 Commodore 64 game based on the television series
 Monkey Magic (video game), a 1979 arcade game released by Nintendo
 Monkey Magic (manga), a manga by Hakase Mizuki
 Monkey Magic (British TV series), a magic TV show

See also
 Monkey Majik, a Japanese rock band
 Journey to the West (disambiguation)